"Ebb Tide" is the first episode of the second season of the HBO original series The Wire. The episode was written by David Simon, from a story by Simon and Ed Burns, and was directed by Ed Bianchi. It originally aired on June 1, 2003.

Plot
A few months after his reassignment to the Baltimore Police's marine unit, Jimmy McNulty discovers a female corpse with broken legs floating in the harbor. He visits Homicide and checks in with Sergeant Jay Landsman, finding out that Colonel William Rawls passed the case off to Baltimore County because the body was found east of the Francis Scott Key Bridge. McNulty studies tide charts as he attempts to prove where the body was dumped into the water; he types up a report and faxes it to the county homicide unit. Rawls and Landsman immediately realize McNulty's involvement when the case is passed back to them, his report proving the body actually went into the water west of the bridge and thus in the city homicide unit's territory.

Roland "Prez" Pryzbylewski meets with his father-in-law, Major Stan Valchek, wishing to stay in Narcotics and work cases like the recent Barksdale investigation. Valchek instead wants Prez to move up the ranks. At Narcotics, Kima Greggs is working her desk job and Thomas "Herc" Hauk has returned to street cases. Greggs and her girlfriend, Cheryl, discuss possible fathers for artificial insemination along with Greggs' job dissatisfaction. Bunk Moreland visits McNulty to ask if he can help him locate Omar Little for the upcoming murder trial of Barksdale soldier Marquis "Bird" Hilton. Bunk later has a chance meeting with Lieutenant Cedric Daniels, now in charge of the evidence room. That evening, Bunk again asks McNulty for help locating Omar, but to no avail.

Bodie Broadus drives to Philadelphia with another Barksdale drug dealer, Sean "Shamrock" McGinty. Bodie is enraged when the car he has collected is devoid of any narcotics and worries over informing his superiors. Stringer Bell, who now leads the Barksdale Organization while Avon Barksdale is imprisoned, reveals that he had Bodie and Shamrock followed. Bodie is later seen running a tower crew. Stringer visits Avon in prison, telling him that the Barksdales' connection with New York, Roberto, failed to deliver the product which Bodie was sent to collect. Stringer later learns that Roberto was arrested by the DEA and becomes concerned that Avon implicated him in exchange for a lighter prison sentence. Stringer is assured that his funds are being returned to him, but the New York suppliers no longer feel safe dealing with the Barksdales.

Frank Sobotka, the treasurer of a stevedores union, meets with fellow union leader Nat Coxson, who is angry that the Baltimore grain pier is still in a state of disrepair. The two disagree over lobbying tactics; Frank wishes to push for having the canal dredged, an ambitious and expensive project that will employ far more people than the grain pier alone, while Nat urges him to set his sights lower by focusing on rehabilitation of the grain pier. Frank later tells his nephew Nick to see someone named "The Greek" about a shipping container they have coming in. Frank confronts his son Ziggy over losing a container. Later, he visits a church where he has donated a stained glass window and asks the priest, Father Lewandowski, to set up a meeting with Senator Barbara Mikulski to discuss difficulties at the docks, including the grain pier. Valchek delivers his own window to the church but is angry that Frank's union beat him to it, and apparently donated much more money to the church than the police and fire unions combined were able to.

At Delores' bar, the stevedores riotously discuss days gone by. Ziggy shows off and exposes himself while standing on a table. The following morning, Nick is met by Ziggy and Johnny Fifty on his way to meet with The Greek about the container and tells Frank that their cut will be the same. Frank and Thomas "Horseface" Pakusa are dismayed when Sergei "Serge" Malatov, The Greek's lieutenant, leaves the container sitting on the dock for several hours. When they insist that he get on with things, Sergei drives away. Frank orders Horseface to "lose" the container in the stack, so as to make it less conspicuous. Later, Maryland Transportation Authority Police officer Beadie Russell stumbles across the container and notices the broken customs seal. She finds the bodies of over a dozen young women inside and calls for backup. Frank and the stevedores gather around as the police arrive.

Production

Starring cast
Paul Ben Victor, Clarke Peters, Amy Ryan, and Chris Bauer are all new additions to the opening credits this season. Credited stars Larry Gilliard, Jr., Deirdre Lovejoy, and Clarke Peters do not appear in this episode.

Guest stars

Seth Gilliam as Detective Ellis Carver
Domenick Lombardozzi as Detective Thomas "Herc" Hauk
Jim True-Frost as Detective Roland "Prez" Pryzbylewski
James Ransone as Ziggy Sobotka
Pablo Schreiber as Nick Sobotka
Al Brown as Major Stan Valchek
Melanie Nicholls-King as Cheryl
J. D. Williams as Preston "Boadie" Broadus
Delaney Williams as Sergeant Jay Landsman
Chris Ashworth as Sergei Malatov
Luray Cooper as Nat Coxson
Jeffrey Fugitt as Claude Diggins
Bill Raymond as The Greek
Ted Feldman as George "Double G" Glekas
Tel Monks as Father Jerome Lewandowski
The Nighthawks (Musical appearance)
Elisabeth Noone as Joan Sobotka
Charley Scalies as Thomas "Horseface" Pakusa

Uncredited appearances
Jill Redding as Delores
J. Valenteen Gregg as Chess
Harold L. Able, Sr. as Moonshot
Stan Stewart as New Charles
Richard Pelzman as Little Big Roy
Kelvin Davis as La La
Bus Howard as Ott
Doug Lory as Big Roy
Jeffrey Pratt Gordon as Johnny "Fifty" Spamanto
Robert F. Colesberry as Detective Ray Cole
Jeffrey Coleman as Coast Guard Officer
Richard Burton as Sean "Shamrock" McGinty
De'Rodd Hearns as Puddin
Addison Switzer as Country
Perry Blackmon as Perry
Rico Whelchel as Rico
Jonathan D. Wray as Tank
Unknown as Dominican Drug Lawyer

First appearances

The Port
Frank Sobotka: International Brotherhood of Stevedores local 1514 checker's union secretary treasurer at the Baltimore port who is smuggling contraband to finance his political campaign to rejuvenate the docks.
Nick Sobotka: Local 1514 stevedore and nephew of Frank Sobotka who acts as a messenger in his smuggling operation.
Ziggy Sobotka: Son of Frank Sobotka and an incompetent stevedore at the port with aspirations of becoming a feared criminal.
Horseface: Longstanding Polish Baltimore port checker and friend of Frank Sobotka who handles all of their smuggled containers.
Nat Coxson: African American local 1514 stevedores union president who worries about Frank's surge in income.
Ott: Senior African American stevedore, often found drinking at Delores' bar, who is set to replace Frank at the next election.
Little Big Roy: Imposing Polish senior port stevedore who is often found drinking at Delores' bar.
Chess: Large, bearded, senior, African American stevedore at Delores' bar.
Moonshot: Smaller, bearded, senior, African American stevedore at Delores' bar.
New Charles: Bald-headed African American Stevedore.
Big Roy: Long-haired young Stevedore at Delores' bar.
Johnny "Fifty" Spamanto: Young Baltimore port checker and friend to Nick and Ziggy Sobotka.
La La: Younger African American Baltimore Port checker and friend to Nick Sobotka.
Delores: Owner of the bar frequented by local 1514 union members.
Joan Sobotka: Nick Sobotka's mother and Frank's sister-in-law.

The Greeks
The Greek: Mysterious figure running smuggling in Baltimore from behind the scenes.
Spiros "Vondas" Vondopoulos: The Greek's second in command and spokesman.
Sergei Malatov: Driver and muscle for The Greek's smuggling operation. Ukrainian.
George "Double G" Glekas: Warehouse front operator for The Greek's smuggling operation and fence.

Law Enforcement
Officer Beatrice "Beadie" Russell: Inexperienced port authority police officer.
Officer Claude Diggins: McNulty's new partner in the marine unit.
 This is the first episode where William Rawls is ranked as a colonel.

Barksdale organization
Sean "Shamrock" McGinty: Barksdale crew lieutenant who drives Bodie to Philadelphia and is Stringer Bell's new second in command.
Country: Recently paroled Barksdale soldier who tails Bodie to Philadelphia.
Tank: Barksdale soldier who accompanies Country.
Puddin: Bodie's second at his new tower drug dealing operation.
Rico: Barksdale enforcer who acts as security at the funeral home.

References

External links
"Ebb Tide" at HBO.com

The Wire (season 2) episodes
2003 American television episodes
Television episodes directed by Ed Bianchi
Television episodes written by David Simon